Koti and Chennayya ( Kōṭi Cennayya,) (Circa 1556 A.D to 1591 A.D.) are legendary Tuluva twin heroes characterized in the Tulu epic of the same name, which is considered one of the two truly long epic in Tulu language. The birthplace of Koti and Chennaya is Padumale in Puttur taluk, Dakshina Kannada. The story of these heroes may be taken to roughly five hundred years back, when reference to Ballads were made in the Tulu Padana. Koti and Chennayya were born to the Deyi Baidethi of the Daivashakthi people of Tulu Nadu. Owing to the brothers heroic deeds, they are worshipped and remembered as protectors. They died in combat near Yenmoor. Memorial temples called garadi "gymnasiums" have been built in the name of Koti and Chennayya all over Tulu Nadu.

Religious places 
 PADUMALE, the birth place of Koti Chennaya.
Shree Brahma Baiderkala Garodi, Yenmoor, Maha samadhi of Koti Chennaya.
Shree Brahma Baidarkala Garadi Kshetra or popularly known as 'Garodi' is a religious place for Tulu community, dedicated to Koti and Chennayya at Garodi in Kankanadi.

In modern culture
 A movie based on the lives of Koti and Chennaya was made in Kannada and Tulu languages as Koti Chennayya
 Koti Chennaya, a 2007 movie made in Tulu which went to win the National Film Awards(54th).
 A project of TV serial in Kannada language based on Koti Chennaya was telecasted in DD chandana, a Kannada channel
In 2019 another movie was made in Tulu as "Deyi Baidethi" in 2019.

See also
 Aati kalenja
 Yakshagana

References

Epic poems
Tulu language
Culture of Tulu Nadu